Henry Walkerdine (1870–1949) was an English footballer who played in the Football League for Notts County.

Harry Walkerdine played and scored in the first Football League match between Notts County and Nottingham Forest at Trent Bridge on 8 October 1892 watched by 18,000 in which Notts won 3-0.

After his football career finished Walkerdine became a journalist in Mansfield.

References

1870 births
1949 deaths
English footballers
Notts County F.C. players
Gainsborough Trinity F.C. players
English Football League players
Association football forwards